"Walk Like an Egyptian" is a song by American band the Bangles. It was released in 1986 as the third single from their second studio album, Different Light (1986). It was the band's first number-one single, being certified gold by the Recording Industry Association of America (RIAA), and was ranked Billboards number-one song of 1987.

Composition
Liam Sternberg said he was inspired to create the song while on a ferry crossing the English Channel. When the vessel hit choppy water, passengers stepped carefully and moved their arms awkwardly while struggling to maintain their balance, and that reminded Sternberg of the depiction of human figures in ancient Egyptian tomb paintings. He wrote the words "Walk like an Egyptian" in a notebook. Later, Sternberg looked back in the notebook, and composing the melody with a guitar, he put together an up-tempo song with lyrics about Egyptian hieroglyphs, the Nile River, crocodiles, desert sand, bazaars and hookah pipes and then segued into modern scenes of blond waitresses, school kids and police officers.

Recording
Sternberg finished a demo version by January 1984 with singer Marti Jones, featuring percussion with kitchen implements. He offered it to Toni Basil, who turned it down. Lene Lovich recorded the first version of the song, but it went unreleased when she decided to take a break from music to raise her family. David Kahne, who like Sternberg was affiliated with Peer International Publishing, was the producer of Different Light. He received a copy of the demo and liked it, especially Jones's "offhand quality"; and took the song to the Bangles, who agreed to record it.

Kahne had each member of the group sing the lyrics to determine who would sing each verse; Vicki Peterson, Michael Steele, and Susanna Hoffs sang lead vocals in the final version on the first, second, and third verses, respectively. Kahne disliked Debbi Peterson's leads, so she was relegated to backing vocals, which angered her and caused tension within the group. The situation was exacerbated by the use of a drum machine in place of her drumming, further diminishing her role in the song. She can be seen playing the tambourine during their 1986 performance on The Old Grey Whistle Test. The whistling in the song was played by a machine.

Chart performance
"Walk Like an Egyptian" was released as the third single from Different Light. It debuted on the Billboard Hot 100 in September 1986. The song reached a peak of number three on the UK Singles Chart in November 1986 and reached number one in the US on December 20, staying at the top of the Hot 100 for four weeks, carrying it over into January 1987. The success of the song and "Manic Monday" propelled Different Light to number two on the Billboard 200 chart, making it the group's most successful album.

Music video
The music video for "Walk Like an Egyptian" was nominated for Best Group Video at the 1987 MTV Video Music Awards. It features both the Bangles performing the song at a concert and scenes of people dancing in  poses similar to those depicted in the Ancient Egyptian reliefs that inspired songwriter Liam Sternberg. Most of these people were filmed on the streets of New York City, although special effects were used to modify photos of Princess Diana, Libyan leader Muammar Gaddafi, and the Statue of Liberty.

In a popular scene from the video, Hoffs was filmed in a close-up where her eyes moved from side to side, looking left and right. When asked about the scene in an interview, Hoffs explained that she was looking at individual audience members during the video shoot, which took place with a live audience. Looking directly at individual audience members was a technique she used to overcome stage fright, and she was unaware that the camera had a close-up on her while she was employing this technique, switching between one audience member on her left and one on her right.

1990 re-release
In 1990, "Walk Like an Egyptian" was re-issued as a single in the UK to promote the Bangles' Greatest Hits album. It featured new remixes for the song called Ozymandias Remix. It charted at number 73 in the UK.

Airplay restrictions
"Walk Like an Egyptian" was one of the songs which were claimed to have been banned by Clear Channel following the September 11, 2001 attacks. Snopes in researching this found that the list was simply suggestions regarding songs to be sensitive about when deciding what to play. It was also included in a "list of records to be avoided" drawn up by the BBC during the Gulf War.

In popular culture
The song was used as the ending credits theme for the first 24 episodes of the Japanese animated series JoJo's Bizarre Adventure: Stardust Crusaders (based on the third part of the manga series JoJo's Bizarre Adventure).

The song was also used in Totally Spies! The Movie,; in season 3 of Eastbound & Down; and during the closing credits of Asterix & Obelix: Mission Cleopatra by Alain Chabat, one of the biggest successes in French cinema box-office history.

In Family Guy, Carter Pewterschmidt is shown listening to the song while singing different lyrics that relate to his life.

Accolades

(*) indicates the list is unordered.

Track listings
7-inch single
 "Walk Like an Egyptian" (3:21)
 "Not Like You" (3:05)
			
12-inch single
 "Walk Like an Egyptian" (extended dance mix) (5:48)
 "Walk Like an Egyptian" (dub mix) (5:17)
 "Walk Like an Egyptian" (a cappella mix) (2:47)
 "Angels Don't Fall in Love" (3:21)

Charts

Weekly charts

Year-end charts

All-time charts

Certifications and sales

See also
List of Billboard Hot 100 number-one singles of 1986
List of Billboard Year-End number-one singles and albums
List of Hot 100 Airplay number-one singles of the 1980s
List of number-one singles in Australia during the 1980s
List of Cash Box Top 100 number-one singles of 1986
List of Dutch Top 40 number-one singles of 1986
List of number-one hits of 1986 (Flanders)
List of number-one hits of 1986 (Germany)
List of number-one singles of 1987 (Canada)
List of number-one singles of 1987 (Spain)

References

Songs about Egypt
1986 songs
1986 singles
1990 singles
Ancient Egypt in the American imagination
The Bangles songs
Billboard Hot 100 number-one singles
Cashbox number-one singles
Columbia Records singles
Dutch Top 40 number-one singles
JoJo's Bizarre Adventure songs
Number-one singles in Australia
Number-one singles in Germany
Number-one singles in South Africa
Number-one singles in Spain
RPM Top Singles number-one singles
Song recordings produced by David Kahne
Ultratop 50 Singles (Flanders) number-one singles
Music videos directed by Gary Weis
1986 neologisms